The Antakya minnow (Crossocheilus caudomaculatus) is a species of ray-finned fish in the genus Crossocheilus. There is some confusion regarding the identity of this fish. Fishbase identifies the species as extinct, formerly occupying the Orontes watershed in Turkey, however a synonym, Hemigrammocapoeta caudomaculata is identified as least concern by the IUCN, and is found in the Asi drainage in Turkey and Syria and Nahr al-Kabir at the border between Syria and Lebanon, and called the Asi golden barb. They may be distinct species.

References

Crossocheilus
Fish described in 1942
Taxobox binomials not recognized by IUCN